The Snahapish River is a river in the U.S. state of Washington. It is a tributary of the Clearwater River, which in turn flows into the Queets River.

Course
The Snahapish River originates in the hilly lands on the west side of the Olympic Mountains on the Olympic Peninsula. Its source is a few miles south of the Hoh River and about a mile east of Mount Octopus. The river flows south through a broad valley. It empties into the Clearwater River near Coppermine Bottom Campground. Clearwater Road follows most of the river's course.

See also
 List of rivers in Washington

References

Rivers of Washington (state)
Rivers of Jefferson County, Washington